Hindi Medium is a 2017 Indian Hindi-language comedy-drama film written and directed by Saket Chaudhary, and produced by Dinesh Vijan and Bhushan Kumar under their respective banners Maddock Films and T-Series. It stars Irrfan Khan, Saba Qamar, Dishita Sehgal, Deepak Dobriyal and Amrita Singh. Set in Delhi, the plot centres on a couple's struggle to get their daughter admitted to a prestigious English-medium school in order to rise in society.

The idea for the film was created by Chaudhary and his co-writer Zeenat Lakhani during the development of his previous film Shaadi Ke Side Effects (2014). It was shot in Chandni Chowk, Anand Lok, Karol Bagh, and Sangam Vihar. The film's soundtrack album was composed by the duo Sachin–Jigar, with lyrics by Priya Saraiya and Kumaar. The score was composed by Amar Mohile. Cinematography was handled by Laxman Utekar, and A. Sreekar Prasad edited the film.

Made on a production budget of  crore, Hindi Medium released on 19 May 2017, and received a generally positive reception from the critics, with particular praise for the cast performances. The film grossed  at the worldwide box office (mostly from China), making it the 38th highest-grossing Indian film of all time. At the 63rd Filmfare Awards, it won Best Film, and Best Actor for Khan. A spiritual successor, Angrezi Medium was released theatrically on 13 March 2020.

Plot
Raj Batra is a successful boutique owner who lives in the old delhi neighbourhood of Chandni Chowk with his wife Meeta Batra and his 5-year-old daughter, Pia Batra. The couple wants Pia to be admitted to a prestigious English-medium school in Delhi as they feel that this will enable her to become a part of the elite of society. They decide on Delhi Grammar School, which ranked the best in the city, but it requires that students must stay within a 3-km radius of the school. They move to a posh villa in Delhi's upscale Vasant Vihar neighbourhood and try to become more refined in their manner. A consultant, Saumya, despite her misgivings about them, tutors them in the answers to be given in the admission interview, but their limited knowledge of English means Pia's application is rejected.

Raj and Meeta learn from an employee that his daughter has been admitted through the RTE quota, a scheme that helps children from poor families to be admitted to prestigious schools. After a scam reveals that rich parents are gaming the quota to admit their children, they move to Bharat Nagar, a slum area, for a month and pretend to be poor. They strike a friendship with Shyam Prakash and Tulsi Prakash, who are hopeful that their son Mohan Prakash gets to study at Delhi Grammar School through the RTE quota. Shyam and Tulsi teach them to live like truly poor people, and Raj joins Shyam at work. However, while Pia eventually gets admission, Mohan's application is rejected.

Raj, Meeta & Pia return to Vasant Vihar. Raj and Meeta make a donation to the Bharat Nagar Government School, where Mohan studies, to renovate it and get new books. After watching their son become fluent in English, Shyam and Tulsi search for the identity of the anonymous donor to thank them. However, when he visits the donor's address in Vasant Vihar, Shyam finds out the truth about Raj pretending to be poor to enable Piaa's admission and leaves to tell Delhi Grammar School's principal Lodha Singhania of Raj's deceit.

Raj and Meeta rush to Delhi Grammar School to get there before Shyam but fail. Shyam, reaching there first, tries to find the principal's office but meets Pia instead, where Shyam endures an emotional moment with her and decides not to tell the principal, but Raaj reacts with guilt for what he has done. Finally, Raj goes to the principal and asks for Piaa's admission to be revoked, while telling the truth, but the principal rejects him. Raj gatecrashes the Annual Day function, gives a speech about English in India and education rights, and leaves, with no one clapping for him, except Meeta. On their way out, Raj & Meeta tell the principal of the Bharat Nagar Government School that they plan to admit Pia to his school to study with Mohan.

Cast 
Credits adapted from Bollywood Hungama:

 Irrfan Khan as Raj Batra
Delzad Hiwale as young Raj
 Saba Qamar as Meeta Malhotra Batra
Sanjana Sanghi as young Meeta
 Dishita Sehgal as Pia Batra
 Amrita Singh as Principal Lodha Singhania
 Deepak Dobriyal as Shyam Prakash
 Neelu Kohli as Geeta Malhotra
 Kiran Khoje as Sushila, Raaj & Meeta's house maid
 Rajeev Gupta as Batra Master, Raaj's father
 Sumit Gulati as Chhotu
 Mallika Dua as Dolly, a customer at Batra Fashion Studio
 Kulbir Kaur as Dolly's mother
 Charu Shankar as Maya
 Tillotama Shome as Saumya, a consultant
 Rajesh Sharma as MLA
 Taran Bajaj as Teashop owner, the man who settled Raaj & Meeta's house in Bharat Nagar
 Ankur Jain as news reader
 Swati Daas as Tulsi Prakash, Shyam's wife
 Neha Dhupia as Aarti Suri, Kabir's wife (special appearance)
 Sanjay Suri as Kabir Suri, Aarti's husband (special appearance)
 Angshuman Nandi as Mohan Prakash, Shyam & Tulsi's son
 Jason as Ayaan Suri, Kabir & Aarti's son
 Anurag Arora as Mr. Kumar, Hindi Teacher at Delhi Grammar School
 Jaspal Sharma as Raj's neighbor
 Taniskaa Sanghvi as a student from Bharat Nagar Government School (Special Appearance in the song “Ek Jindari”)

Production
Made on a production budget of  crore, Hindi Medium was produced by Vijan of Maddock Films and Bhushan Kumar of T-Series. The film was directed by Chaudhary, his third after romantic comedy films Pyaar Ke Side Effects (2006) and Shaadi Ke Side Effects (2014). He came up with the idea of making a film about India's education system with his co-writer Zeenat Lakhani during the development of the latter film. They found the idea too extensive to include in Shaadi Ke Side Effects, so after its release, they decided to incorporate the idea into a separate film. Stating the reason to make Hindi Medium, Chaudhary said, "The subject is so relevant. We realised that today irrespective of the background of the parent, they still want to have the best education for the children."

Pre-production work began after the release of Shaadi Ke Side Effects. Chaudhary began working on the story at that time, and he chose Delhi as the film's key location. The production crew consisted primarily of people Chaudhary had worked with on Pyaar Ke Side Effects and Shaadi Ke Side Effects, with the exception of production designer Mustafa Stationwala—they are editor A. Sreekar Prasad; dialogue writer Amitosh Nagpal; and cinematographer Laxman Utekar. The score was composed by Amar Mohile.

On 29 May 2016, News18 reported the casting of Saba Qamar in the film, which marked her Bollywood debut. Khan had recommended the casting of Qamar to the makers of the film. He said, "When I saw her YouTube videos, I recommended her to the director and producer and they really liked her". Speaking about her role, Qamar said, "I play a person who didn't get an opportunity to fulfil her dreams so she comes up with a scheme about giving the daughter a life that she didn't have".
Khan commented that he had accepted the role as it tackled the realistic subject of the challenges of obtaining a good education in India.

Qamar arrived in Mumbai from Pakistan in July 2016, and the film's principal photography began in the same month. The film was shot in Chandni Chowk, Anand Lok, Karol Bagh, and Sangam Vihar. The shooting was completed in October 2016. A song sequence was also filmed in Georgia. Qamar commented that she enjoyed working with Khan, and felt safe while shooting in Delhi. In the same interview with Pakistani newspaper Dawn, she commented that her experience wasn't affected by the nationalist far-right political party Maharashtra Navnirman Sena's hostility towards Pakistan at the time.

Soundtrack

Hindi Medium's soundtrack consists of two original compositions: "Hoor" and "Ek Jindari", which were produced by Sachin–Jigar. The songs were written by Priya Saraiya and Kumaar, whereas Atif Aslam and Taniskaa Sanghvi, rendered the vocals. In addition to the original tracks, the makers recreated two songs: "Suit Suit", written and sung by Guru Randhawa and Arjun and composed by Randhawa and Rajat Nagpal, and "Oh Ho Ho Ho", composed by Sukhbir and Abhijit Vaghani, sung by Sukhbir, rapped by Ikka Singh and written by Kumaar. The album rights of the film were acquired by T-Series, and it was released on 21 April 2017.

Joginder Tuteja of Bollywood Hungama, rated the album a 3 out of 5 stars. He said that "the music of Hindi Medium turns out to be better than expected", and praised the inclusion of recreations of "Suit Suit" and "Oh Ho Ho Ho" as they were previously popular Punjabi songs. V. Lakshmi of The Times of India in a positive review of the album said that, "by the time the album ends, the listeners are left humming the tunes!". Suanshu Khurana of The Indian Express highlighted the song "Hoor" as the best song on the album. The track "Ek Jindari" was remade as "Ek Zindagi" for the spiritual successor Angrezi Medium (2020), thereby retaining the original composition and vocals from the track.

Release
The film was initially scheduled to release on 12 May 2017, but was pushed by a week back, thereby clashing with Half Girlfriend, scheduled for release on the same date. Hindi Medium was declared 'tax-free' in Gujarat, Maharashtra, Madhya Pradesh and Delhi.

In February 2018, following the success of Dangal (2016) and Secret Superstar (2017) in China, it was announced that Hindi Medium was to be released in China. Hindi Medium released in China on 4 April 2018 to coincide with the Qingming Festival. The film's Chinese title is 起跑线 (Qi Pao Xian), which means The Starting Line.

Controversy
The makers of the Bengali film Ramdhanu (2014), directed by the duo Nandita Roy and Shiboprosad Mukherjee, had launched a copyright case against Hindi Medium, claiming that the storyline was similar to their film. In response to this, Chaudhary said "We have researched our script over a year and it is based on original material. I would request everyone involved to not rush to a judgement without ascertaining the facts. And the facts can easily be confirmed by watching the film." Roy and Mukherjee later withdrew their case.

Critical reception

Hindi Medium received a generally positive reception from critics, with particular praise for Khan's and Qamar's performances.

Rohit Bhatnagar of Deccan Chronicle called the film a "masterpiece" and praised Khan's and Qamar's acting. Rachit Gupta of Filmfare rated the film 4.5 out of 5 stars and said that it was a "refreshingly funny and brilliantly insightful film on parenting and education." Madhureeta Mukherjee of The Times of India highlighted the script, and the comedic elements of the film as its strengths. Rohit Vats of Hindustan Times giving 3.5 stars out of 5 stars, commented that "Khan asks the viewers to take a stand against faulty Indian education system". Samrudhi Ghosh of India Today gave 3 out of 5 stars, praising Khan's and Qamar's performances, said "Hindi Medium may use over-dramatised events to make its message hit home, but in spite of its hiccups, the film is not bogged down because of the performances and the humour". Smrity Sharma of India.com rated the film 2.5 out of 5 stars, and wrote: "Decent story, humour, a few heart tugging moments and effortless performances by Irrfan Khan, Saba Qamar and Deepak Dobriyal make the movie watchable." Shubhra Gupta of The Indian Express giving 2 out of 5 stars, praised Khan's acting however felt that the writing was "flat", and that some of the supporting characters were "more caricature than real".

Hindi Medium received a generally positive reception from critics outside of India. A reviewer for Time Out gave it 4 (out of 5) stars: "With all its merits, though, the film stumbles near the end with its overly sentimental conclusion." The reviewer concluded that "the film is one of the best Bollywood films". James Marsh of South China Morning Post rated it 3.5 stars out of 5 stars, calling it "a classical comedy of manners full of humour and playful performances". Sadaf Siddique of Dawn observed: "Chaudhary gets full marks for novelty, he fails to adequately flesh his ideas out".

Rajeev Masand of CNN-IBN gave 2.5 stars out of 5, commenting "Despite its shortcomings, the film is never unwatchable and benefits enormously from a winning performance by Irrfan Khan who makes his every moment on screen count. From his hilarious wooing of a mother-daughter pair of potential customers at his shop in the film's first half to his earnest amends on discovering his conscience late into the final act, he has you eating out of his palm. For Irrfan alone, Hindi Medium may be worth a watch."

Box office
The film emerged as a sleeper hit at the box office. Within three days of its April 2018 release in China, Hindi Medium crossed  at the Chinese box office, crossing the  mark worldwide, becoming Khan's highest-grossing Hindi film, surpassing his 2013 release The Lunchbox. By 16 April 2018, Hindi Medium had crossed the  mark worldwide, becoming one of the top 20 highest-grossing Indian films at the time.

Domestic
Hindi Medium collected  on its opening day. It released on the same day as the much bigger budget film, Half Girlfriend (2017), which earned  on the first day. Gradually, the film turned to be more successful than the former. After one week, the film grossed  at the box office. The film grossed  during its lifetime run in Indian theatres. It was one of 2017's top ten most commercially successful Hindi films in India.

Overseas
The film grossed  overseas in 2017. Following its April 2018 release in China, the film crossed  overseas, becoming the seventh Indian film to cross the  mark at the overseas box office. It also surpassed the overseas gross of 2018's highest-grossing Indian film Padmaavat.

China
On its opening day in China, on 4 April 2018, the film grossed . Hindi Medium surpassed Dangal (2016) and Bajrangi Bhaijaan (2015) to have the second highest opening day for an Indian film in China, behind only Secret Superstar (2018).

The film's success is attributed to strong word-of-mouth, helped by a 9.1 rating at the Chinese ticketing website Maoyan, as well as Khan's recognition among Chinese audiences from international films such as Jurassic World, The Amazing Spider-Man, and Life of Pi. The film grossed  during its lifetime run at the Chinese box office. This made it the fourth highest-grossing Indian film in China (after Dangal, Secret Superstar and Bajrangi Bhaijaan), until it was surpassed by the 2019 release of Andhadhun (2018) in China.

Awards
At the 63rd Filmfare Awards, the film garnered six nominations, winning for Best Film and Best Actor for Khan. Chaudhary won Best Director and Khan won for Best Actor at the 19th IIFA Awards. It received six nominations at the Zee Cine Awards.

Sequel

After the success of Hindi Medium, a sequel to the film was planned. Regarding the success of the film, producer Vijan told Mid-Day, "The response we have got is phenomenal. The entire unit of Hindi Medium, including Irrfan and Saba, who look cool as a couple on-screen, should be repeated in a film. There is definitely scope for a sequel. We would certainly explore it." On 24 January 2018, Vijan confirmed the sequel to Times Now. He said, "We have just finished typing the second part", with "Just finishing touches are being put", however, "I think you will have to wait for an official announcement for that."

On 30 March 2019, it was announced that Kareena Kapoor has been added to the cast of the sequel to play the role of a police officer and filming will start from April. On 5 April, the sequel's title was announced as Angrezi Medium and filming began in Udaipur. This was completed in July. On 17 February 2020, the film's release date was changed to 13 March 2020 from the earlier release date of 20 March. This film marked Irrfan Khan's final film before his death on 29 April 2020.

See also
List of Bollywood films of 2017

References

External links

 
 

2010s Hindi-language films
2017 films
Indian comedy-drama films
Films scored by Abhijit Vaghani
Films scored by Sachin–Jigar
Films scored by Guru Randhawa
Films scored by Rajat Nagpal
Films about the education system in India
Films set in Delhi
Films involved in plagiarism controversies
Films scored by Amar Mohile
T-Series (company) films
2017 comedy-drama films